Sheldon Rostron is a South African field hockey coach.

He coached the team at the 2018 Women's Hockey World Cup.

References

1974 births
Living people
South African field hockey coaches